The United States House of Representative elections of 2002 in North Carolina were held on November 5, 2002, as part of the biennial elections to the United States House of Representatives.  All thirteen seats in North Carolina, and 435 nationwide, were elected.

The election saw the number of represented elected from North Carolina increase by one after the 2000 census.  The Republicans won seven seats, as in 2000, while the Democrats gained one to put them at six.

This election should not be confused with the election to the North Carolina House of Representatives, which was held on the same day.

Summary

Results

Footnotes

2002
2002 North Carolina elections